Eloy School District 11  is a school district in Pinal County, Arizona.

References

External links
 

School districts in Pinal County, Arizona
Eloy, Arizona